Sridharan Jeganathan (11 July 1951 – 14 May 1996) was a Sri Lankan cricketer who played in two Test matches and five One Day Internationals from 1983 to 1988.

Jeganathan made his highest first-class score of 74 against Tasmania on Sri Lanka's brief tour of Australia in 1982–83. He later became Malaysia's national coach. He was the first Sri Lankan Test cricketer to die.

References

1951 births
1996 deaths
Cricketers from Colombo
Sri Lanka Test cricketers
Sri Lanka One Day International cricketers
Sri Lankan cricketers
Sri Lankan Tamil sportspeople
Sri Lankan Hindus
Cricketers at the 1987 Cricket World Cup
Nondescripts Cricket Club cricketers